Bernard Webber may refer to:
 Bernard C. Webber (1928–2009), coxswain of a US Coast Guard motor lifeboat
 USCGC Bernard C. Webber, Sentinel class cutter, named for the coxswain
 Bernard George Webber (1914–2000), Canadian politician and educator

Webber, Bernard